Agata Zupin (born 17 March 1998) is a Slovenian athlete specialising in the 400 metre hurdles. She competed at the 2017 World Championships where she reached the semifinals. She won a silver medal in the event at the 2017 European U20 Championships.

International competitions

1 Did not start in the final

Personal bests

Outdoor

Indoor 

All information taken from athlete's World Athletics profile.
NR = National record

References

1998 births
Living people
Slovenian female hurdlers
World Athletics Championships athletes for Slovenia
Athletes (track and field) at the 2018 Mediterranean Games
Athletes (track and field) at the 2022 Mediterranean Games
Mediterranean Games competitors for Slovenia
20th-century Slovenian women
21st-century Slovenian women
Mediterranean Games medalists in athletics
Mediterranean Games silver medalists for Slovenia